The 1988 Supercoppa Italiana was a match played by the 1987–88 Serie A winners Milan and 1987–88 Coppa Italia winners Sampdoria. It took place on 14 June 1989 at the San Siro in Milan, Italy, and was the first edition of the trophy. Milan won the match 3–1.

Although originally scheduled for August 1988, it was played in June 1989, due to the 1988 Summer Olympics being held in the same period.

Match details

References 

1988
Supercoppa 1988
Supercoppa 1988
Super